The Potomac Appalachian Trail Club (PATC) is a volunteer organization that works to maintain hiking trails in the Washington, D.C. area of the United States. PATC was founded in 1927 to protect and develop the local section of the then new Appalachian Trail.

Appalachian Trail
PATC maintains  of the Appalachian Trail, allocated to PATC by the Appalachian Trail Conservancy, which manages all day-to-day trail and land management activities under agreement with the National Park Service.  PATC's area of responsibility begins at the southern end of Shenandoah National Park in Virginia and reaches north to Pine Grove Furnace in Pennsylvania.  General trail maintenance is the responsibility of volunteer trail overseers, while trail construction and repair from serious damage, as well as larger projects, are managed by volunteer work crews, such as the Blue and White Crew.

Other trails
In addition to the Appalachian Trail responsibilities, PATC also maintains several hundred miles of trails in Virginia, West Virginia, the District of Columbia, Maryland, and Pennsylvania. These trails are found in state and national parks, national forests, and occasionally through land held by municipalities, private owners, or the club itself. One such trail is the  Tuscarora Trail.  Other examples are the  Massanutten Trail, the  Bull Run-Occoquan Trail, and the trails in the Great North Mountain area that lead to the Big Schloss peak.

Other activities
The club also has separate sections for climbing and mountaineering, ski touring, wilderness search and rescue (SMRG/ASRC), and trail patrol. PATC operates a number of primitive cabins for rent to members and non-members (one such cabin is Corbin Cabin). In addition, the club publishes maps and guidebooks for the Appalachian Trail and other trails the club maintains, publishes a monthly newsletter, the Potomac Appalachian, and organizes hikes throughout the club's area of operations.

References

Notes
The Potomac Appalachian, The Newsletter of the Potomac Appalachian Trail Club.
The Bulletin, The original newsletter of the Potomac Appalachian Trail Club (early years).
Shenandoah National Park - Appalachian Trail History

External links
Potomac Appalachian Trail Club
PATC Acme Treadway Company trail crew
PATC A.T. Management, Shenandoah National Park - South District

Appalachian culture in Maryland
Appalachian culture in Virginia
Appalachian culture in Pennsylvania
Appalachian culture in Washington, D.C.
Appalachian Trail
Hiking organizations in the United States
Shenandoah National Park
West Virginia culture